Ivanhoe was a BBC television series from 1970. The script was by Alexander Baron, based on Sir Walter Scott's 1819 novel Ivanhoe. The director was David Maloney.

It was shown on the Sunday tea-time slot on BBC1, which for several years showed fairly faithful adaptations of classic novels aimed at a family audience. It was later shown on US television. It consisted of ten 25-minute episodes. Eric Flynn, who played the title role, became better known for his work in stage musicals. Other cast members, such as John Franklyn-Robbins, Hugh Walters and Bernard Horsfall, were regulars in British TV classic dramas of the 1960s and 1970s.

The complete series was released on a Region 2 DVD two-disc set in September 2017 by Simply Media.

The opening uses the fanfare at the start of Symphony No. 4 (Tchaikovsky).

Cast 
Eric Flynn as Ivanhoe
Anthony Bate as Sir Brian de Bois Guilbert, the villain
Vivian Brooks as Rebecca
Clare Jenkins as Rowena
Bernard Horsfall as King Richard
Tim Preece as Prince John
Clive Graham as Robin of Locksley
Michael Napier Brown as Miller

References

External links 
IMDb entry
Review of DVD version

BBC television dramas
1970 British television series debuts
Television shows based on Ivanhoe
1970 British television series endings
1970s British drama television series